The 2003 ITU Triathlon World Championships were held in Queenstown, New Zealand on December 6, 2003.

Medal summary

References
ITU World Championships Results (Archived 2009-09-25)

2003
World Championships
Triathlon World Championships
International sports competitions hosted by New Zealand
Triathlon competitions in New Zealand